La Schelle Tarver (born January 30, 1959) is a former backup outfielder in Major League Baseball who played for the Boston Red Sox during the  season. Listed at 5' 11", 165 lb., he batted and threw left-handed.

Early years
Tarver was born in 1959 in Modesto, California, and grew up in Madera, California. He was selected as a Northern California All-American first baseman while playing at Madera High School. He was drafted by the California Angels while still in high school, but instead enrolled in junior college. In 1980, he transferred to Cal State Sacramento.

Professional baseball
Tarver was drafted by the New York Mets in the 1980 draft. He was assigned to the Mets' farm system from 1981 to 1985, including stints at Lynchburg, Jacksonville (MS), and Tidewater.

In November 1985, the Mets traded Tarver to the Boston Red Sox as part of a multi-player deal that also sent pitchers Wes Gardner and Calvin Schiraldi to Boston in exchange for pitchers Tom McCarthy and Bob Ojeda and two minor leaguers. In the spring of 1986, Tarver was assigned to Pawtucket where he became the club's starting right fielder.

Tarver made his major-league debut in July 1986 after Boston center fielder Tony Armas was injured. At the time he was called up, he was leading the International League with a .359 batting average and a .466 slugging percentage. In his first at bat with the Red Sox, he was cheered by 33,000 fans at Fenway Park. Despite striking out, he "protected the plate and made [Mike] Witt work for the out by tossing 11 pitches."

In his one season With the Red Sox, Tarver was a .120 hitter (3-for-25) with three runs and one RBI in 13 games. He did not have an extra-base hit or a stolen base. Although he did not steal any bases at the major league level, he was primarily valued for his speed in the outfield and on the base paths. A memorable incident occurred in 1986 when a PA announcer at an opposing ballpark announced him as "Tarver La Schelle".

After his baseball career, Tarver was a longtime corrections officer for Fresno County, California.

References

External links

Retrosheet
Venezuelan Professional Baseball League

1959 births
Baseball players from California
Boston Red Sox players
Jackson Mets players
Leones del Caracas players
American expatriate baseball players in Venezuela
Living people
Lynchburg Mets players
Major League Baseball outfielders
Pawtucket Red Sox players
Sacramento State Hornets baseball players
Shelby Mets players
Sportspeople from Modesto, California
Tidewater Tides players
People from Madera, California
African-American baseball players
21st-century African-American people
20th-century African-American sportspeople